American actor Leonardo DiCaprio has won 101 awards from 252 nominations. He has been nominated for seven Academy Awards, five British Academy Film Awards and eleven Screen Actors Guild Awards, winning one from each of these and three Golden Globe Awards from thirteen nominations.

DiCaprio received three Young Artist Award nominations for his roles in television shows during the early 1990s—the soap opera Santa Barbara (1990), the dramedy Parenthood (1990) and the sitcom Growing Pains (1991). This was followed by his film debut in the direct-to-video feature Critters 3 (1991). He played a mentally challenged boy in the drama What's Eating Gilbert Grape (1993), a role that earned him nominations for the Academy Award and Golden Globe Award for Best Supporting Actor. Three years later, he appeared in Romeo + Juliet, for which he earned a Best Actor award from the Berlin International Film Festival. DiCaprio featured opposite Kate Winslet in the romantic drama Titanic (1997), the highest-grossing film to that point. For the film, he garnered the MTV Movie Award for Best Male Performance and his first Golden Globe Award for Best Actor nomination. For a role in The Beach, he was nominated for two Teen Choice Awards (Choice Actor and Choice Chemistry) but also a Golden Raspberry Award for Worst Actor. DiCaprio was cast in the role of con-artist Frank Abagnale, Jr. in the crime drama Catch Me If You Can, and starred in the historical drama Gangs of New York—films that earned him two nominations at the 2003 MTV Movie Awards.

DiCaprio was nominated for his first Academy Award, BAFTA Award and Critics' Choice Movie Award for Best Actor for his role as Howard Hughes in the biographical drama The Aviator (2004); he won a Golden Globe Award in the same category. For his next appearances—the crime drama The Departed (2006), the war thriller Blood Diamond (2006), the drama Revolutionary Road (2008) and the biographical drama J. Edgar (2011)—he garnered nominations for the Golden Globe Award for Best Actor – Motion Picture Drama. DiCaprio earned nominations for the Saturn Award for Best Actor for his roles in the psychological thriller Shutter Island (2010) and the science fiction thriller Inception (2010). He co-produced and played stockbroker Jordan Belfort in The Wolf of Wall Street (2013), a role that earned him the Golden Globe Award for Best Actor – Motion Picture Musical or Comedy. The film was nominated for several Academy Awards, including Best Picture and Best Actor. DiCaprio won the Golden Globe Award, BAFTA Award, and Academy Award for Best Actor for his portrayal of Hugh Glass in the 2015 film The Revenant. For playing an aging television actor in the comedy-drama Once Upon a Time in Hollywood (2019), he received nominations for an Oscar, a Golden Globe and a BAFTA Award for Best Actor.

Awards

Footnotes

See also 
 List of oldest and youngest Academy Award winners and nominees – Youngest nominees for Best Actor in a Supporting Role
 List of actors with Academy Award nominations
 List of actors with two or more Academy Awards nominations in acting categories
 List of Golden Globe winners
 Leonardo DiCaprio filmography

References 

Leonardo DiCaprio
DiCaprio, Leonardo